Ancystroglossus is a genus of beetles in the family Carabidae, containing the following species:

 Ancystroglossus deplanatus Reichardt, 1967
 Ancystroglossus dimidiaticornis Chaudoir, 1863
 Ancystroglossus gracilis Chaudoir, 1863
 Ancystroglossus ovalipennis Reichardt, 1967
 Ancystroglossus punctatus Reichardt, 1967
 Ancystroglossus strangulatus Chaudoir, 1863

References

Dryptinae